Unseeing Eyes is a lost 1923 American silent north country drama film produced by William Randolph Hearst and distributed by Goldwyn Pictures. Edward H. Griffith directed Lionel Barrymore, Seena Owen, Louis Wolheim, and Gustav von Seyffertitz in the action packed drama.  The movie was filmed in part at the Gray Rocks Resort in the Laurentian Mountains of Quebec, Canada.

Cast
Lionel Barrymore as Conrad Dean
Seena Owen as Miriam Helston
Louis Wolheim as Laird
Gustav von Seyffertitz as Father Paquette
Walter Miller as Dick Helston
Charles Byer as Mr. Arkwright
Helen Lindroth as Mrs. Arkwright
Jack W. Johnston as Trapper (credited as Jack Johnston)
Louis Deer as Eagle Blanket
Francis Red Eagle as Singing Pine
Dan Red Eagle as Halfbreed
Paul Panzer as Halfbreed
Mayo Methot as Extra (uncredited)

See also
Lionel Barrymore filmography

References

External links

Two different lobby posters for the film: poster 1 and poster 2 (archived, retrieved from Wayback)

1923 films
American silent feature films
Lost American films
Films based on short fiction
Goldwyn Pictures films
1923 drama films
Silent American drama films
American black-and-white films
1923 lost films
Lost drama films
Films directed by Edward H. Griffith
1920s American films